Eatonville is a town in Orange County, Florida, United States, six miles north of Orlando. It is part of Greater Orlando. Incorporated on August 15, 1887, it was one of the first self-governing all-black municipalities in the United States.  The Eatonville Historic District and Moseley House Museum are in Eatonville. Author Zora Neale Hurston grew up in Eatonville and the area features in many of her stories. 

In 1990 the town founded the Zora Neale Hurston Museum of Fine Arts. Every winter the town stages the Zora Neale Hurston Festival of the Arts and Humanities. A library named for her opened in January 2004.

The population was 2,159 at the 2010 census. The majority are African American.

Artist Jules Andre Smith has done a series of paintings depicting life in Eatonville during the 1930s and 1940s. Twelve of these works are at the Maitland Art Center in the adjacent town of Maitland.

Eatonville is home to WESH and WKCF, two television stations serving the Orlando television market.

History
A Post Office opened at Eatonville in 1889, and closed in 1918. While sources seem to disagree on the exact date and year of the town's incorporation, the town's official site provides a detailed account of the process and the dates. According to that official source, the town is named after Josiah C. Eaton, one of two white landowners from the North who were willing to sell sufficient land to African Americans to incorporate as a black town.

Hurston's novel Their Eyes Were Watching God is set in the town and nearby communities, many of which have disappeared with the expansion of Greater Orlando.

Before the days of racial integration, Club Eaton was a popular stop on the Chitlin' Circuit, hosting performers ranging from B.B. King to Aretha Franklin, the young local Ray Charles, Sam Cooke, The Platters, Duke Ellington, Ella Fitzgerald, Billie Holiday and James Brown.

Mayors
 Columbus H. Boger Sr. ~ 1887 - 1888
 Joseph E. Clark ~ 1889 - 1890
 John Hurston ~ 1897 - 1899
 Joseph E. Clark ~ 1900 - 1912
 John Hurston ~ 1912 - 1916
 Matthew B. Brazell ~ 1916 - 1920
 Samuel M. Moseley ~ 1920 - 1922
 Hyrum N. Lester ~ 1922 - 1924
 Augustus Johnson ~ 1930? - ?
 Columbus H. Crooms ~ 1938 - 1963
 Nathaniel Vereen Sr. ~ 1963 - 1980
 Abraham Gordon ~ 1980 - 1986
 Nathaniel Vereen Sr. ~ 1987 - 1989
 Ada Sims ~ 1990 - 1992
 Harry Bing ~ 1992 - 1994
 Anthony Grant ~ 1994 - 2009
 Bruce Mount ~ 2009 - 2015
 Anthony Grant ~ 2015 - removal for voter fraud
 Eddie Cole ~ 2016 - 2022
 Angie Gardner ~ 2022 - present

Eatonville Historic District
The Eatonville Historic District was designated and added to the National Register of Historic Places on February 3, 1998. The district is bounded by Wymore Road, Eaton Street, Fords, and East Avenues, Ruffel, and Clark Streets. It contains 48 historic buildings. Several are related to the town's establishment as a home for African Americans and to its most famous former resident, Zora Neale Hurston.

Gallery

Geography

Eatonville is located at  (28.618727, –81.383440).

Demographics

As of the census of 2000, there were 2,432 people, 761 households, and 548 families residing in the town. The racial makeup of the town was 89.31% African American, 7.5% White, 0.49% Native American, 0.29% Asian, 1.56% from other races, and 0.82% from two or more races. Hispanic or Latino of any race were 3.54% of the population.

There were 761 households, out of which 35.5% had children under the age of 18 living with them, 28.0% were married couples living together, 37.6% had a female householder with no husband present, and 27.9% were non-families. 22.5% of all households were made up of individuals, and 8.5% had someone living alone who was 65 years of age or older.  The average household size was 2.92 and the average family size was 3.42.

In the town, the population was spread out, with 33.6% under the age of 18, 8.8% from 18 to 24, 27.5% from 25 to 44, 19.6% from 45 to 64, and 10.4% who were 65 years of age or older.  The median age was 31 years. For every 100 females, there were 88.7 males.  For every 100 females age 18 and over, there were 81.3 males.

The median income for a household in the town was $29,457, and the median income for a family was $31,042. Males had a median income of $21,719 versus $21,328 for females. The per capita income for the town was $11,257.  About 21.9% of families and 25.0% of the population were below the poverty line, including 29.3% of those under age 18 and 24.5% of those age 65 or over.

Transportation 
Interstate 4 passes through the city limits, but there is no exit. The closest exits are Florida State Road 423 (to the south) and Florida State Road 414 (to the north).

Education 
The Robert Hungerford Normal and Industrial School was founded in 1897 for vocational education for Black students by Professor and Mrs. Russell C. Calhoun, a graduate of Tuskegee Institute. At that time, segregation in the South provided few opportunities for non-whites. The  land was donated by E.C. Hungerford of Chester, Connecticut in memory of his physician son, Robert, who died of yellow fever. Cash donations came from across the country, including $400 from Booker T. Washington. The school was successful and more than 100 students were boarding in 1927 as well as local children attending and adult classes offered at night. Ten years later, Orange County provided bus transportation for black children from nearby Winter Park to attend the school. The school provided both vocational and college preparation, teaching English, Latin, history, general science, biology, algebra, geometry, industrial arts and home economics. Students could also learn bookkeeping and typing, physical education and agriculture. Programs for drafting and radio were added during the 1940s. The campus included girls & boys dormitories, a dining hall, library, chapel, laundry, industrial training shops, home economics laboratory, equipment barn and farmland. To keep expenses down, students were assigned various duties around the campus including jobs at the school's dairy, chicken coops, gardens and janitorial/maintenance of the institution's classrooms and buildings. The school had been privately funded until the Orange County Public Schools (OCPS) took control in 1950. The Hungerford School was closed in 2010.

Land 
That land was almost 40% of the town of Eatonville. However, OCPS purchased the land from the trust in 1951 for about $16,000 with the stipulation that it be used "for the education of Black children". Since the original purchase, OCPS has petitioned the courts multiple times to reduce the number of acres required to be used for the education of black children from 300 to 100 with OCPS receiving almost $8 million. The remaining  parcel was appraised in 2019 for $20 million, but the OCPS announced their intention to sell the land to a developer for $14 million on March 31, 2023. The plans include a "new community" of 350 homes, apartments, retail businesses and restaurants. Existing residents claim the new development would wipe out the historic community and violate the land agreement, so locals are in a fight with the school board.

Notable people 
 Ha Ha Clinton-Dix, football safety
 Zora Neale Hurston, folklorist and author
 Deacon Jones, football defensive end
 Norm Lewis, actor and baritone singer

Cultural references 
 "Eatonville" is a song by indie rockers The Samples, written by Andy Sheldon.  The song was written after Sheldon read Their Eyes Were Watching God and is on their fourth album, The Last Drag, released in 1993.

References

Further reading

External links 

 Town of Eatonville official website
 Eatonville Branch Library
 ZoraNealeHurstonFestival.com
 "Zora Neale Hurston Dust Tracks Heritage Trail, Zora Neale Hurston Branch Library" at visitflorida.com
 Today in History: January 7, Library of Congress

Towns in Orange County, Florida
Greater Orlando
Towns in Florida
Populated places established by African Americans
1887 establishments in Florida
African-American history of Florida